Karaaliler may refer to:

 Karaaliler, Bucak
 Karaaliler, Göynük